Landmark Productions is a theatre production company in Dublin, Ireland. Established in 2003 by Anne Clarke, Landmark produces plays in Ireland and tours Irish work abroad. The company has an association with a number of Irish writers including Enda Walsh and Paul Howard, the creator of Ross O’Carroll-Kelly. Recent award-winning productions include Enda Walsh’s Ballyturk and Arlington, Conall Morrison’s Woyzeck in Winter and the Donnacha Dennehy/Enda Walsh operas The Last Hotel and The Second Violinist.

Awards 

In 2011, Landmark Productions received the Judges’ Special Award in the Irish Times Theatre Awards in recognition of its "sustained excellence in programming and for developing imaginative partnerships to bring quality to the Irish and international stage". In 2015, Anne Clarke received the Special Tribute Award at the Irish Times Theatre Awards for her "work as a producer of world-class theatre in the independent sector in Ireland."

Co-productions and international touring 

In its first 15 years, Landmark Productions has forged partnerships with arts institutions in Ireland and beyond. Main partners in Ireland include Galway International Arts Festival, the Gaiety Theatre, Olympia Theatre, Project Arts Centre, Dublin Theatre Festival, the Abbey Theatre, and the Everyman together with Irish National Opera and its precursor, Wide Open Opera. Landmark has also toured shows internationally to venues including St. Ann’s Warehouse, Irish Arts Center and the Brooklyn Academy of Music in New York City; the Barbican Centre, the National Theatre and Royal Opera House in London, UK and at Edinburgh Festival Fringe and Edinburgh International Festival in Scotland. A film version of The Last Hotel, co-produced with Brink Films and Wide Open Opera, was broadcast on Sky Arts in 2016.

Productions 

 Walking with Ghosts (Gabriel Byrne), world premiere - 2022

 Ulysses 2.2 (curated, presented and produced with ANU and MoLI), world premiere - 2022

 Straight to Video (Emmet Kirwan), world premiere - 2021

 The First Child (Donnacha Dennehy/Enda Walsh), world premiere - co-produced with Irish National Opera - 2021

 The Book of Names (co-produced with ANU), world premiere - 2021

 Backwards up a Rainbow (Rosaleen Linehan and Fergus Linehan), world premiere - 2021

 Medicine (Enda Walsh), world premiere - co-produced with Galway International Arts Festival - 2021

 The Saviour (Deirdre Kinahan), world premiere - 2021

 Happy Days (Samuel Beckett) starring Siobhán McSweeney and Marty Rea - 2021

 Theatre For One (and a Little One) (Roddy Doyle, Sonya Kelly, Louis Lovett, Pauline McLynn), world premiere - co-produced with Octopus Theatricals - 2020

 Blood in the Dirt (Rory Gleeson) - co-produced with Keynote - world premiere- 2019

 Theatre for One (Marina Carr, Stacey Gregg, Emmet Kirwan, Louise Lowe, Mark O'Rowe, Enda Walsh), world premiere - co-produced with Octopus Theatricals - 2019

 Asking for It (by Louise O’Neill, adapted by Meadhbh McHugh in collaboration with Annabelle Comyn), world premiere - co-produced with The Everyman in association with the Abbey Theatre - 2018
 
 Grief is the Thing with Feathers (by Max Porter, adapted and directed by Enda Walsh), world premiere, produced by Complicite and Wayward Productions in association with Landmark Productions and Galway International Arts Festival – 2018
  
 The Approach (Mark O’Rowe), world premiere – 2018
 
 The Second Violinist (Donnacha Dennehy/Enda Walsh), world premiere, Irish Times Irish Theatre Awards winner for Best Opera Production, co-produced with Irish National Opera – 2017
 
 Woyzeck in Winter (adapted by Conall Morrison with lyrics by Stephen Clark), world premiere, nominated for six Irish Times Theatre Awards, including Best Production, winning two – Best Actor for Patrick O’Kane and Best Supporting Actress for Rosaleen Linehan – 2017
 
 Ross O’Carroll-Kelly: Postcards from the Ledge (Paul Howard), world premiere, one-man show starring Rory Nolan, who has played Ross in all the stage shows to date – 2017
 
 Arlington (Enda Walsh), world premiere, starring Charlie Murphy, Hugh O’Conor and Oona Doherty – 2016
 
 The Walworth Farce (Enda Walsh), starring Brendan Gleeson, Brian Gleeson and Domhnall Gleeson – 2015
 
 The Last Hotel (Enda Walsh/Donnacha Dennehy), world premiere, Irish Times Theatre Award for Best Opera Production, co-produced with Irish National Opera – 2015
 
 Once (Enda Walsh) – 2015, 2016, 2017
 
 Ballyturk (Enda Walsh), world premiere, starring Mikel Murfi, Cillian Murphy and Stephen Rea; Irish Times Theatre Award winner for Best Production, co-produced with Galway International Arts Festival. In a subsequent revival, which toured to St. Ann’s Warehouse in New York, the part originally played by Stephen Rea was played by the actress Olwen Fouéré. – 2014 and 2017
 
 Ross O’Carroll-Kelly: Breaking Dad (Paul Howard), world premiere – 2014 
 
 These Halcyon Days (Deirdre Kinahan) – 2013
 
Howie the Rookie (Mark O’Rowe), Irish Times Theatre Award winner for Best Actor - Tom Vaughan-Lawlor – 2013
 
 The Talk of the Town (Emma Donoghue), world premiere – 2012
 
 Greener (Fiona Looney), world premiere – 2012
 
 Testament (Colm Tóibín), world premiere – 2011
 
 Misterman (Enda Walsh), Irish Times Theatre Award winner for Best Actor – Cillian Murphy, co-produced by Galway International Arts Festival – 2011
 
 Ross O’Carroll-Kelly: Between Foxrock and a Hard Place (Paul Howard), world premiere – 2010
 
 October (Fiona Looney), world premiere – 2009
 
 Knives in Hens (David Harrower) – 2009
 
 Miss Julie (August Strindberg in a version by Frank McGuinness) – 2008
 
 Alice in Wonderland (Mary Elizabeth Burke-Kennedy) – 2008
 
 Ross O’Carroll-Kelly: The Last Days of the Celtic Tiger (Paul Howard), world premiere – 2007
 
 Sleeping Beauty (Rufus Norris) – 2007
 
 Blackbird (David Harrower) – 2007
 
 Underneath the Lintel (Glen Berger) – 2006
 
 The Secret Garden (Frances Hodgson Burnett, dramatised by Neil Duffield) – 2006
 
 Edward Albee’s The Goat, or Who is Sylvia? – 2005
 
 Dandelions (Fiona Looney), world premiere, starring Pauline McLynn and Deirdre O’Kane – 2005
 
 Skylight (David Hare) – 2004

References

External links
 

Companies based in Dublin (city)
Entertainment companies established in 2003
Theatre production companies